The women's javelin throw event at the 1989 Summer Universiade was held at the Wedaustadion in Duisburg on 29 and 30 August 1989.

Medalists

Results

Qualification
Qualification distance: 52.00 metres

Final
Held on 30 August

References

Athletics at the 1989 Summer Universiade
1989